Yok Siam Year 1 is a Thai quiz show television program. It encouraged Thai people in each province using their ability joyfully about knowledges and being proud in their hometown. It broadcast on Monday - Friday 6:30 - 6:55 p.m. on Modern Nine TV. It had begun airdate on February 18, 2008 before ended on January 9, 2009. It was produced by Workpoint Entertainment.

In addition, Maha Vajiralongkorn, Crown Prince of Thailand gave certificates with his signature to the province that is the winner.

After Yok Siam Year 1 had ended airdate, Yok Siam Year 2 began airdate.

Competitions and rules

First round
In the first round, there were 76 provinces. Teams are divided into 19 groups, four provinces per one group. In each group, there were two matches. (two provinces per one match) In each team, there were 10 competitors with different jobs, and header of each team was well-known people in that province.

Competitors of each team had to answer the questions about knownledges in Thailand, by choosing two choice, ก (A) or ข (B). Which team reached three or five scores first, was the winner, and the winner would meet another winner team in the group final. Which team won, was the Winner of the group, advanced to the Second round.

Note: red number means all competitors of each team answered wrong.

Seeding
Teams are divided into 19 groups, four provinces per one group.

Group 1

Group 2

Group 3

Group 4

Group 5

Group 6

Group 7

Group 8

Group 9

Group 10

Group 11

Group 12

Group 13

Group 14

Group 15

Group 16

 Note: Group 16 had no winner of the group.

Group 17

Group 18

Group 19

Second round
In the second round, there were 18 provinces advancing from the first round. (except group 16 without winner) Which team reached three scores first, was the winner, and advanced to the Third round.

Seeding
Teams were seeded into two pots – Pot 1 and Pot 2.

Matches
Note: red number with x means all competitors of each team answered wrong.

{| class="wikitable" style="text-align: center"
|-
!rowspan=1 width=7%| Match
!rowspan=1 width=40%| Team 1
!rowspan=1 width=13%| Score
!rowspan=1 width=40%| Team 2
|-

|1||style="background:#ccffcc;" | Chanthaburi Province (King of Chanthabun) ||6-6{{efn|While Chanthaburi 5-5 Nong Khai, moderator ask a question: Which one is a wrong action in the public and have to be fined 100 baht, (ก) Spitting, (ข) Shouting profanity. All competitors of Chanthaburi answered ข, and all of Nong Khai answered ก. Moderator said that ก. was the correct choice, making Nong Khai won and advanced to 3rd round. But in the next break, the moderator called the header of two provinces and said that both ก and ข were correct choices, and proclaimed Chanthaburi and Nong Khai advanced to 3rd round.}}
| style = "background:#ccffcc;" | Nong Khai Province (Nakha Khanong Khong) 

|-
|2||style="background:#ccffcc;" | Chiang Rai Province (Tung Ala Wat) ||3-2
| style = "background:#ffcccc;" | Yala Province (Phayak Yang Raeng)

|-
|3||style="background:#ccffcc;" | Sukhothai Province (Phra Ruang Knight) || 5-5
| style = "background:#ccffcc;" | Nonthaburi Province (Kan Yao Phayong) 

|-
|4||style="background:#ccffcc;" | Ang Thong Province (Golden Rice Killer) ||3-1x
| style = "background:#ffcccc;" | Chumphon Province (South Gateway Warrior)

|-
|5||style="background:#ccffcc;" | Sisaket Province (Det Lamduan) ||3-1x
| style = "background:#ffcccc;" | Mae Hong Son  (Three Fog Warrior)

|-
|6||style="background:#ccffcc;" |  Prachin Buri Province (Brave Bamboo) ||3-2x
| style = "background:#ffcccc;" | Yasothon Province (Bang Fai Pha-ngat)

|-
|7||style="background:#ffcccc;" | Samut Prakan Province (Khot Ai Khium)||2-3
| style = "background:#ccffcc;" | Phetchaburi Province (Sweet Eye Killer) 

|-
|8||style="background:#ffcccc;" | Kanchanaburi Province (Mueang Song Kwae)||2x-2x
| style = "background:#ffcccc;" | Nakhon Ratchasima Province (Koracha Warrior)

|-
|9||style="background:#ffcccc;" | Prachuap Khiri Khan Province (Khao Sam Roi Yod)||0x-3
| style = "background:#ccffcc;" | Ranong Province (Chao Bun Tay) 

|}

Third round
In the third round, there were ten provinces advancing from the second round. Which team reached 2 in 3 sets first, be the winner and advance to the fourth round.

Matches
Note: red number with x means all competitors of each team answered wrong.

Fourth round
In the fourth round, there were five provinces advancing from the third round. They played a round-robin tournament, in which each team is scheduled for four matches against other teams. This means that a total of ten matches are played within a round. The top two teams advanced to the final.

Standings

Matches
Note: red number with x means all competitors of each team answered wrong.

Final
The final was divided into three set: set 1, set 2 (one point each set), and set 3 (two points each set). Which team has more points, will be the winner.

Winner and runner-up

Special airdates

Yok Siam Trivia
The Yok Siam trivia special airdates took place before the final match between Ranong and Nonthaburi. There were 11 episodes.

See also
 Yok Siam Year 2''

Notes

References

Y
Y
Yok Siam
Y
Y
2000s Thai television series
2008 Thai television seasons
2009 Thai television seasons